Aisin Gioro Yunci (14 January 1714 – 31 August 1785), was a Manchu Prince of the Third rank .He was the 23rd surviving son of Kangxi Emperor.

Life 
Yinqi was born on 14 January 1714 to Imperial Concubine Jing, Lady Shi. He was not embroiled in succession brawl among Kangxi Emperor's sons due to prematurity. In 1730, Yunqi was granted a title of grace defender duke (镇国公). Like his half-brother Yunxu, Yunqi was charged with the affairs of Eastern Qing tombs. In 1735, Yunqi was promoted to Prince of the Fourth rank.

In November 1784, he was granted the title of Prince of the Third Rank (多罗贝勒).

He was posthumously named Prince Cheng of the Third Rank  and given a status of Prince of the Second Rank which meant that he and his family members were entitled to receive privileges of Prince of the Second Rank.

See also

 Royal and noble ranks of the Qing dynasty
 Ranks of imperial consorts in China#Qing

References 

 The Thirthy– third son of the emperor, 爱新觉罗宗谱网, The Genealogy of Aisin Gioro.Retrieved 1 January 2022
 

1714 births
1785 deaths
Kangxi Emperor's sons
Qing dynasty imperial princes